Magnesium stearate is the chemical compound with the formula . It is a soap, consisting of salt containing two equivalents of stearate (the anion of stearic acid) and one magnesium cation (Mg2+).  Magnesium stearate is a white, water-insoluble powder. Its applications exploit its softness, insolubility in many solvents, and low toxicity. It is used as a release agent and as a component or lubricant in the production of pharmaceuticals and cosmetics.

Manufacturing
Magnesium stearate is produced by the reaction of sodium stearate with magnesium salts or by treating magnesium oxide with stearic acid.

Uses
Magnesium stearate is often used as an anti-adherent in the manufacture of medical tablets, capsules and powders. In this regard, the substance is also useful because it has lubricating properties, preventing ingredients from sticking to manufacturing equipment during the compression of chemical powders into solid tablets; magnesium stearate is the most commonly used lubricant for tablets. However, it might cause lower wettability and slower disintegration of the tablets and slower and even lower dissolution of the drug.
  
Magnesium stearate can also be used efficiently in dry coating processes.

In the production of pressed candies, magnesium stearate serves as a release agent. It is also used to bind sugar in hard candies such as mints.

Magnesium stearate is a common ingredient in baby formulas.

In the EU and EFTA it is listed as food additive E470b.

Occurrence
Magnesium stearate is a major component of bathtub rings. When produced by soap and hard water, magnesium stearate and calcium stearate both form a white solid insoluble in water, and are collectively known as soap scum.

Safety
Magnesium stearate is generally considered safe for human consumption at levels below 2500 mg per kg of body weight per day and is classified in the United States as generally recognized as safe (GRAS). In 1979, the FDA's Subcommittee on GRAS Substances (SCOGS) reported, "There is no evidence in the available information on ... magnesium stearate ... that demonstrates, or suggests reasonable grounds to suspect, a hazard to the public when they are used at levels that are now current and in the manner now practiced, or which might reasonably be expected in the future."

References

Excipients
Magnesium compounds
Stearates